Inanimate Objects is the second studio album by Australian alternative rock band, Atlas Genius, released through Warner Bros. Records on 28 August 2015. It peaked at No. 150 on the Billboard 200, and dropped off the chart in the following week. The album's first single, 'Molecules', was a modest hit on alternative radio and spent 22 weeks on Billboard's Alternative Airplay charts, peaking at #10 the week of November 21, 2015.

Track listing

iTunes edition bonus track

Personnel 
Atlas Genius
Keith Jeffery – vocals, guitar, bass, percussion, keyboards, drums, programming
Michael Jeffery – drums, percussion, background vocals

Other musicians
Frederik Thaae – guitar, bass, keyboards, drum programming, background vocals
David Larson – keyboards
Alan Wilkis – programming, background vocals
Elyse Rogers – background vocals
Carrie Keagan – background vocals
Jonny Kaps – background vocals

Production
Atlas Genius – production
Frederik Thaae – production
Big Data – additional production
Jesse Shatkin – additional production
Manny Marroquin – mixing
Andrew Maury – mixing
Mike Duncan – mixing assistant
Chris Galland – mixing assistant
Ike Schultz – mixing assistant
Dylan Morgan – assistant engineer
Joe LaPorta – mastering
Kii Arens – cover art
Donny Phillips – cover art
Frank Maddocks – design, photography

Charts

References

2015 albums
Atlas Genius albums
Warner Records albums